Elies Mahmoud (born 10 February 2001) is a French professional footballer who plays as a midfielder for French club Le Havre AC.

Professional career
In the summer of 2020, Mahmoud signed with Le Havre AC. Mahmoud made his professional debut with Le Havre AC in a 1-0 Ligue 2 win over AS Nancy on 26 September 2020.

Personal life
Born in France, Mahmoud is of Algerian descent.

References

External links

 HAC Foot Profile

2001 births
Living people
Sportspeople from Dreux
French footballers
French sportspeople of Algerian descent
Association football midfielders
Le Havre AC players
Ligue 2 players
Championnat National 3 players
Footballers from Centre-Val de Loire
Sportspeople from Eure-et-Loir